Tamás Bakócz (1442, in Erdőd15 June 1521, in Esztergom) was a Hungarian archbishop, cardinal and statesman.

He was the son of a wagoner and was adopted by his uncle, who trained him for the priesthood and whom he succeeded as rector of Tétel (1480). He studied in Breslau and Padua. Shortly afterwards he became one of the secretaries of King Matthias Corvinus, who made him bishop of Győr and a member of the royal council (1490). Under Vladislaus II of Bohemia and Hungary (1490–1516) he became successively bishop of Eger, the richest of the Hungarian sees, archbishop of Esztergom (1497), cardinal (1500), and titular Latin Patriarch of Constantinople (1510).

From 1490 to his death in 1521 he was the leading statesman of Hungary and mainly responsible for foreign policy. It was solely through his efforts that Hungary did not accede to the league of Cambrai, was consistently friendly with Venice, and formed a family compact with the Habsburgs. He was also the only Magyar prelate who seriously aspired to the papal throne. In 1513, on the death of Julius II, he went to Rome for the express purpose of bringing about his own election as pope. He was received with more than princely pomp, and all but succeeded in his design, thanks to his extraordinary adroitness and the command of an almost unlimited bribing-fund. But Venice and the emperor played him false, and he failed.

He returned to Hungary as papal legate, bringing with him the bull of Leo X proclaiming a fresh crusade against the Turks. But the crusade degenerated into a jacquerie which ravaged the whole kingdom, and much discredited Bakócz. He lost some of his influence at first after the death of Wladislaus, but continued to be the guiding spirit at court, till age and infirmity confined him almost entirely to his house in the last three years of his life. He left a fortune of many millions.

He and his family are buried in a separate chapel of the Esztergom Basilica, the most precious artwork of the Hungarian Renaissance.

References

External links

1442 births
1521 deaths
People from Satu Mare County
Archbishops of Esztergom
15th-century Roman Catholic bishops in Hungary
16th-century Roman Catholic archbishops in Hungary
Hungarian politicians
Latin Patriarchs of Constantinople
Burials at Esztergom Basilica
Bishops of Eger
16th-century Hungarian cardinals